Operation Prime Chance (August 1987 – June 1989) was a United States Special Operations Command operation intended to protect U.S.-flagged oil tankers from Iranian attack during the Iran–Iraq War. The operation took place roughly at the same time as Operation Earnest Will (July 1987 – September 1988), the largely naval effort to escort the tankers through the Persian Gulf. The operation was begun after the mining of the U.S.-flagged Kuwaiti oil tanker Bridgeton.

Overview
The two operations were intertwined—United States Army helicopters flew nighttime search-and-destroy missions from Navy frigates and destroyers and from two leased barges in the northern Persian Gulf. Navy SEALs and explosive ordnance disposal operated from the barges as well. But while Earnest Will was the widely publicized reaction to Kuwaiti pleas for help, Prime Chance was secret. The army helicopters flew at night, slipping to and from navy flight decks under cover of darkness. Tactics included using MH-6 Little Birds as spotters for the more heavily armed AH-6s (for barge-launched missions), and using the warship's radar and that of their SH-60 Seahawk helicopters for the same purpose (on ship-launched efforts).

Planning

Planning and preparation for Prime Chance was launched soon after a tanker on the very first Earnest Will convoy struck a mine, which made it clear that more forces would be necessary to assure the safety of the civilian vessels. The Joint Chiefs of Staff launched a search for helicopter pilots who could fly at night from navy ships, then set out to train them for the special requirements of the job. Helicopters from the army's 160th Special Operations Aviation Regiment (Airborne) reached the navy's command ship  in the Persian Gulf on 5 August 1987. The detachment was divided into two teams, with call sign SEABAT and one MH-6 Little Bird, two AH-6s, aircrew, and maintainers. On 8 August, one detachment participated in a convoy escort mission aboard La Salle. The other flew onto the frigate  to protect minesweepers operating in the narrow shipping channel west of Farsi Island. The following day, the La Salle detachment transferred to the frigate  and escorted the convoy to the Gulf of Oman.

Execution

Soon afterward, operations began from the barges, dubbed Mobile Sea Bases (MSBs). They were set up as naval special warfare task units (NSWTU) run by a SEAL commander and answering to the regional naval special warfare task group. Their mission was to stop Iranian forces from mining the Persian Gulf or otherwise attacking shipping. Each mobile sea base had two detachments of Mark III patrol boats, a SEAL platoon, an EOD detachment, Marines to provide security, army MH-6 and AH-6 Little Bird helicopter gunships and Black Hawk rescue birds, and air force combat controllers. Mobile Sea Base Hercules was crewed by East Coast naval special warfare units, including Patrol Boats 777 and 758 from Special Boat Unit 20 and Special Boat Unit 24. Mobile Sea Base Wimbrown 7 was crewed by West Coast units, including Patrol Boats 753 and 757 from Special Boat Unit 13 and Patrol Boats 775 and 776 from Special Boat Unit 12.

On 21 September 1987, Iran Ajr, an Iranian ship converted for use as a minelayer, was attacked. Using night-vision devices, Army gunship crews watched the Iranian vessel lay several mines, then swooped in firing miniguns and rockets. A SEAL team boarded the vessel and quickly seized it. During the attack, five Iranians were killed and 26 were captured. Several Iranian sailors were rescued from the waters of the Persian Gulf after jumping overboard during the attack. After collecting intelligence data the SEALs and EOD scuttled the vessel the following day.

In January 1988, Task Force 118 arrived with OH-58D Kiowa Warrior helicopters.

Earnest Will ended about five months after the Iran-Iraq ceasefire began in July 1988. Wimbrown 7 soon returned to port, but Prime Chance patrols continued from Hercules until June 1989.

Units
Ships involved in Prime Chance include:
Mobile Sea Bases Hercules and Wimbrown 7, barges leased from an oil company for use by SEALs, EOD, Navy small-boat crews, and Army helicopters

Units involved in Prime Chance include:
160th Special Operations Aviation Regiment (Airborne), nicknamed the "Night Stalkers": the army's elite special-operations aviation regiment
Task Force 118, a regular army aviation unit flying AH-58D Warrior helicopters whose mast-mounted IR sights helped spot small boats. On 15 January 1991, the unit became 4th Squadron, 17th Cavalry Regiment, and then in 1994, 4th Squadron, 2d Cavalry Regiment.
SEAL Team 1
SEAL Team 2
EOD Mobile Unit Five
EOD Mobile Unit Six
Special Boat Unit 11
Special Boat Unit 12
Special Boat Unit 13
Special Boat Unit 20
Special Boat Unit 24
3rd Battalion 325th Airborne Battalion Combat Team SETAF 
Detachment from 1st Battalion 5th Marines
3/4 ADAR, 82nd Airborne Division. Vulcan crews provided surface defense.
174th Military Intelligence Company, 513th Military Intelligence Brigade, provided intelligence to Wimbrown 7
Detachment from 1st Battalion 2nd Marines.

References

Further reading

 About the "Battle of Farsi Island" engagements of early October 1987.

 (Briefly discusses TF118 operations from a U.S. Navy frigate)

External links

Photos from Operation Prime Chance and Earnest Will - March to October, 1988
A warrant officer's personal TF118 narrative
Photos of the captured Iran Ajr, its mines, its sailors

20th-century military history of the United States
Operations involving American special forces
Military operations involving the United States
Iran–United States military relations
Military operations of the Iran–Iraq War  
Naval battles of the Iran–Iraq War involving the United States
United States Marine Corps in the 20th century